Weightlifting at the 1983 Southeast Asian Games was held between 29 May to 31 May at Politeknik Ngee Ann, Singapore.

Medal summary

Men

Medal table

References

 https://eresources.nlb.gov.sg/newspapers/Digitised/Article/straitstimes19830530-1.2.106
 https://eresources.nlb.gov.sg/newspapers/Digitised/Article/straitstimes19830601-1.2.137

1983 Southeast Asian Games events